Hustai National Park, located in the Khustai Mountains (lit. Birch Mountains) of Töv Province (Aimag), is a national park of Mongolia. It is also known as Khustain Nuruu National Park.  The Tuul River runs through the park.

History

The Mongolian Government declared Hustai National Park as a Specially Protected Area in 1993, one year after the initiation of the reintroduction project of the Takhi (Przewalski's horse) to the Hustain Nuruu. The HNP extends through the Khentii Mountains and includes the western edge of the Mongolian steppe at the boundaries of Altanbulag, Argalant and Bayankhangai Soums of Töv Province. The park is about 100 km from the capital city of Ulaanbaatar to the west.

The HNP covers 50,600 ha land which is home to 459 species of vascular plants, 85 species of lichens, 90 species of moss and 33 species of mushrooms. 44 species of mammals have been recorded, including Altai wapiti, Mongolian gazelle, roe deer, wild boar, wild sheep, ibex, Mongolian marmots, grey wolf, Eurasian lynx, Pallas's cat, red fox, corsac fox and Eurasian badger. The 217 species of birds include golden eagle, lammergeier, great bustard, whooper swan, black stork, Daurian partridge and little owl.  There are 16 species of fish, 2 species of amphibians, and 385 species of insects (including 21 species of ants, 55 species of butterflies, 10 species of bush crickets and 29 species of grasshoppers). A new species of soil insect has been found in the Hustai and given the scientific name of Epidamaeus khustaiensis.

In 2002, the Man and the Biosphere Reserves organization of UNESCO certified the HNP as a member of the world biosphere network of natural reserves. The HNPT was enrolled as a member of IUCN in 2007.

Management
Hustai National Park was the first park to be managed by a Non-governmental Organization specializing in nature and environmental conservation. The park was managed by the Mongolian Association for the Conservation of Nature and the Environment during 1993–2003. A dedicated NGO, the Hustai National Park Trust (HNPT), was established in 2003 and signed a contract with the Mongolian Government which delegated the management of the HNP to the new NGO.

The HNPT conducts operations in five main activity areas as follows: 
	Conservation and protection of ecosystems and historical sites in the park. 
	Reintroduction of the last species of wild horse – the Takhi –  and building-up of a sustainable wild population.  
	Organization of international training courses and research. 
       Development of ecotourism. 
	Development of the buffer zone of the HNP.

The Trust has around 60 employees, working in five units as follows: 
	Administration 
	Training and research 
	Protection 
	Tourism 
	Buffer zone development

Since 1993, the HNP has implemented the following international projects, supported by the Dutch Government: 
	Hustain Nuruu nature reserves, 1993–1997
	Conservation of the biodiversity of the HNP, 1998–2003
	Support to the management of the HNP, 2004–2008
       Development of sustainable livelihoods in the buffer zone of the HNP, 2004–2008
	Adaptation to changing conditions in the HNP and its buffer zone, 2009–2012

Panorama

References

External links
 Official Site
 Map of Hustai National Park, OpenStreetMap.org

National parks of Mongolia
Protected areas established in 2003